Petr Arenberger (born 4 December 1958 in Prague) is a Czech dermatologist, university teacher and politician. From April to May 2021 he was the Minister of Health of the Czech Republic in the second government of Andrej Babiš. He was criticised for dissolving the COVID expert group that had accused the government of mismanagement of the crisis.

References 

people from Prague
1958 births
Health ministers of the Czech Republic
Living people
COVID-19 pandemic in the Czech Republic
Czech dermatologists
Charles University alumni
Academic staff of Charles University
Czech hospital administrators
Communist Party of Czechoslovakia members